Giovanni Scotti (1 September 1911 – 26 October 1992) was an Italian ice hockey player. He competed in the men's tournament at the 1936 Winter Olympics.

References

External links
 

1911 births
1992 deaths
Olympic ice hockey players of Italy
Ice hockey players at the 1936 Winter Olympics
Ice hockey people from Milan